German attempts at the colonization of the Americas consisted of German Venezuela (also ), St. Thomas and Crab Island in the 16th and 17th centuries.

History

Klein-Venedig

Klein-Venedig ("Little Venice"; also the etymology of the name "Venezuela") was the most significant part of the German colonization of the Americas, from 1528 to 1546, in which the Augsburg-based Welser banking family to the Habsburgs was given the colonial rights by Emperor Charles V, who was also King of Spain and owed debts to them for his Imperial election. In 1528, Charles V issued a charter by which the Welsers possessed the rights to explore, rule and colonize the area with the primary motivation of searching for the legendary golden city of El Dorado. The venture was initially led by Ambrosius Ehinger, who founded Maracaibo in 1529. After the deaths of first Ehinger (1533), Nikolaus Federmann, Georg von Speyer (1540), Philipp von Hutten continued exploration in the interior. In absence of von Hutten from the capital of the province the crown of Spain claimed the right to appoint the governor. The Spanish Juan de Carvajal was nominated governor by the Emperor Charles V and tried to take control of the province. In 1545 he founded El Tocuyo with German colonists of Coro. On Hutten's return to the capital, Santa Ana de Coro, in 1546, the governor Carvajal had Hutten and Bartholomeus VI. Welser executed. Subsequently, Charles V revoked Welser's charter.

The Welsers transported German miners to the colony, as well as 4,000 African slaves as labor to work sugar cane plantations. Many of the German colonists died from tropical diseases, to which they had no immunity, or during frequent wars with Native Americans.

Brandenburg-Prussia

The Brandenburgisch-Africanische Compagnie of Brandenburg (the future Kingdom of Prussia) established trading posts in Africa and leased a trading post on St. Thomas from the Danish West India-Guinea Company in 1685. In 1693, the Danes seized the post, its warehouse, and all its goods without warning or repayment. There were no permanent German settlers.

Duchy of Courland

The Duchy of Courland, a German-led vassal state of the Polish–Lithuanian Commonwealth, leased New Courland (Neu-Kurland) on Tobago in the Caribbean from the British. The colony failed and was restored several times. A final Courish attempt to establish a Caribbean colony involved a settlement near modern Toco on Trinidad.

County of Hanau

The counties of Hanau-Lichtenberg and Hanau-Münzenberg, under Frederick Casimir and his adviser Johann Becher, funded  but did not complete  an extravagant program to lease Guiana from the Dutch West India Company. Calling his new realm the Hanauish-Indies (Hanauisch-Indien), Frederick Casimir ran up huge debts that ultimately forced him into a regency by some of his relatives.

See also

German interest in the Caribbean, German efforts in 1867–1917
German colonial empire, after 1880
German colonization of Valdivia, Osorno and Llanquihue
Nueva Germania
Pozuzo, a Peruvian community of German origin.
Blumenau

References

Further reading
 

 
 
Montenegro, Giovanna. 2022. German Conquistadors in Venezuela. The Welsers’ Colony, Racialized Capitalism, and Cultural Memory. Notre Dame: University of Notre Dame Press.
 
 

European colonization of the Americas
Americas